William Gerard Montgomery (born March 2, 1967) is an American attorney who has served as a justice of the Arizona Supreme Court since September 2019. He previously served as the County Attorney for Maricopa County, Arizona from 2010 to 2019.

Early life
Montgomery is a West Point graduate and a Gulf War veteran. He graduated Magna Cum Laude and was awarded the Order of the Coif from the Sandra Day O'Connor College of Law in 2001.

Career
During Montgomery's tenure, the county attorney's office gained national recognition for its Restitution Specialist and Sex Assault Backlog programs.

While serving as the County Attorney, Montgomery called for formal written protocols to address use of force incidents and served as the Arizona State Director for the National District Attorneys Association.

In August 2019, attorneys for Jodi Arias filed an ethics complaint against Montgomery, claiming he covered up misconduct and harassment by the lead prosecutor on the case.  The complaint was later dismissed following a nearly 14-month screening process by the State Bar that found no evidence of any misconduct by Montgomery.

Elections

Arizona Attorney General

In 2006, Montgomery ran for Arizona Attorney General, losing to incumbent Terry Goddard.

Maricopa County Attorney
In the 2010 special election to replace Andrew Thomas, who resigned to run for Arizona Attorney General, Montgomery defeated interim county attorney Rick Romley in the Republican Primary. Montgomery went on to defeat Libertarian Michael Kielsky in the general election.

Montgomery won election to a full term in 2012 in a rematch against Kielsky. He won re-election again in 2016 against Democrat Diego Rodriguez

Arizona Supreme Court appointment
In January 2019, Montgomery applied for an appointment to a vacancy in the Arizona Supreme Court. The commission did not pass Montgomery's name to the governor, which is required for a judicial apportionment, citing "concerns over the pattern of misconduct at the Maricopa County Attorney's Office and a lack of relevant professional experience."

In June 2019, Montgomery applied for a second vacancy on the Arizona Supreme Court. This time, after Governor Doug Ducey replaced several members of the state judicial nominating commission, Montgomery's name was sent to the governor, who selected him for the supreme court seat on September 4, 2019. Montgomery was sworn into office on September 6, 2019.

References

External links
Biography at Ballotpedia
Vacancy Application. Archived from the original on September 4, 2019.

1967 births
Living people
20th-century American lawyers
21st-century American judges
21st-century American lawyers
Arizona lawyers
Arizona Republicans
Justices of the Arizona Supreme Court
District attorneys in Arizona
People from Gilbert, Arizona